The Tampa Bay Area Regional Transit Authority, or TBARTA, is a regional transportation agency of the U.S. state of Florida which was created on July 1, 2007.  The purpose of the agency is "to plan, develop, finance, construct, own, purchase, operate, maintain, relocate, equip, repair, and manage multimodal systems in Hernando, Hillsborough, Manatee, Pasco, and Pinellas Counties."  The agency coordinates its efforts with the Florida Department of Transportation to improve transportation in the Tampa Bay Area.

Regional Transportation Master Plan
TBARTA adopted its first Regional Transportation Master Plan in 2009. The inaugural master plan identified the vision for the regional transit network. An update was completed in 2011 that introduced a regional freight and a regional roadway network to the plan.

The 2013 Master Plan Update was a minor update to refine all three networks, and incorporate the progress made locally and regionally towards implementing the regional vision.

The 2015 Master Plan Update was developed by TBARTA’s Board and Committees in collaboration with the West Central Florida Metropolitan Planning Organization (MPO) Chairs Coordinating Committee (CCC) — representing each of the region’s MPOs and TPO. The 2015 Update ensures consistency with the MPOs’ Long Range Transportation Plans (LRTPs) and updates the CCC’s Regional LRTP.

For 2015, TBARTA and the CCC eliminated duplication of efforts for the Master Plan and Regional LRTP Updates by making them one and the same.

During its 2017 legislative session, the Florida Legislature installed TBARTA as Tampa Bay’s regional transit facilitating arm. In March, 2018, Gov. Rick Scott authorized $1 million allowing the authority to develop a business strategy to implement regional transit.

On June 22, 2018, Executive Director Ray Chiaramonte announced his plans to resign, due to his decision to run for Hillsborough County Commissioner.

In September 2018, David Green, former CEO of the Greater Richmond Transit Company, was named as the new executive director, replacing Ray Chairmonte.

Transit

As of 2007, TBARTA does not operate any transit system, but the agency is discussing developing various modes of premium transit service, including express bus, bus rapid transit, light rail, and commuter rail.

In 2017, The Florida Legislature renamed the organization to The Tampa Bay Area Regional TRANSIT Authority.

In November 2018, TBARTA's board approved the Regional Transit Feasibility Plan, with a focus on establishing a 41-mile, bus-rapid transit option connecting Wesley Chapel to St. Petersburg via Interstate 275. The project is designed to serve as a catalyst for other transit options designed to reduce congestion on roads.

As of 2019, TBARTA managed a range of commuter services in the Tampa Bay region, designed to help commuters save money, reduce traffic congestion, and help the environment,  These services include Vanpool, Carpool, BikeBuddy, a regional school commuter program, and an emergency ride home program.

Corridor studies
After the Regional Transportation Master Plan was adopted in 2009, several high-priority corridor studies were initiated by TBARTA, including:
St. Petersburg to Clearwater through Greater Gateway Area (Pinellas Alternatives Analysis)
Howard Frankland Bridge PD&E Study and Regional Transit Corridor Evaluation
SR 54/SR 56 Express Bus/Managed Lanes Project Concept Development Study
USF to Wesley Chapel Transit Corridor Evaluation
I-75 Regional Bus Sarasota/Bradenton to Downtown Tampa Conceptual Analysis Study
Westshore Area to Crystal River/Inverness Transit Corridor Evaluation
I-75 Regional Bus Wesley Chapel to Downtown Tampa Conceptual Analysis Study
Short-Term Regional Premium Transportation Enhancements Study
Extension of Premium Services from Sarasota to Bradenton and North Port Regional Transit Corridor Evaluation

Priority projects
In cooperation with its regional partners, TBARTA identified eight Regional Priority Projects for 2015, based on factors such as connectivity, regionalism, ability to implement, mobility, and support, among others. These projects are:

Interchange improvements at I/275, SR 60, and Memorial Highway, located near the Tampa International Airport
Continued improvements to the SR 54/56 Corridor in Pasco County
Construction of the Gateway Expressway in Pinellas County
Replacement of the northbound Howard Frankland Bridge
Suncoast Parkway 2 extension to connect Hernando and Citrus Counties as well as a potential future connection between Northwest Florida and the Tampa Bay region
Tampa Bay Express (Starter Projects), which are express lanes on our interstate system in Hillsborough and Pinellas Counties to support roadway and premium transit connections
TIA People Mover Connection to the future Westshore Intermodal Center
University Parkway/I-75 Interchange area improvements

Managed lanes
Managed lanes are an important part of step-by-step implementation of the regional transportation vision. Managed lanes are commonly referred to as "express lanes", where operational strategies such as pricing, vehicle eligibility, and/or access control are implemented to regulate demand and utilize available capacity. Examples of managed lanes include toll lanes, reversible lanes, value priced lanes, and high-occupancy vehicle lanes. The TBARTA Managed Lanes network includes the existing toll facilities in the region as well as a mid-term and long-term network of managed lanes identified by the TBARTA Master Plan and by FDOT.

Commuter services 
On April 30, 2010, TBARTA merged with Bay Area Commuter Services, the state-funded provider of commuter options programs in five of the seven TBARTA members counties (Citrus, Hernando, Hillsborough, Pasco, and Pinellas). In doing so, TBARTA became the official Tampa Bay Area regional provider of commuter options including: carpool, vanpool, Schoolpool, Bike Buddy, Emergency Ride Home (ERH), remote work, compressed work schedule, and commuter benefits.

One Call, One Click
The One Call, One Click program underscores transportation support needs and services for veterans, through a $1.1 million grant from the Federal Transit and Veterans Administrations. The aim of the grant is to better connect veterans, military families, the disabled, and regular citizens with the available transportation resources across the seven-county region, in one convenient online and call-center portal. Work continues on this program, with staff working to identify transportation service providers, contract services for call center activities, and develop a more robust online element. TBARTA was also successful in obtaining a secondary FTA grant to be used to promote and market the One Call/One Click program. The funds must be expended by September 2017.

Partners
Citrus County Transit, Florida Department of Transportation (FDOT), FDOT District One Commuter Services, Hillsborough Area Regional Transit Authority (HART), Hernando County MPO, Hillsborough County MPO, Manatee County Transit (MCAT), One Bay, Pasco County MPO, Pasco County Public Schools, Pasco County Public Transportation (PCPT), Pinellas County MPO, Pinellas Realtor Organization, Pinellas Suncoast Transit Authority (PSTA), Polk County Transportation Planning Organization (TPO), Sarasota-Manatee MPO, Sarasota County Area Transit (SCAT), Tampa Bay Partnership (TBP), Tampa Bay Regional Planning Council (TBRPC), Tampa Downtown Partnership, The Hernando Express (THE Bus), West Central Florida Metropolitan Planning Organization Chairs Coordinating Committee (WCFCCC).

Governing board
The governing board of TBARTA has 17 members (15 voting members and two non-voting advisors). The voting members consist of the following:

One elected official appointed by the respective County Commissions from Citrus, Hernando, Hillsborough, Pasco, Pinellas, Manatee, and Sarasota counties;
One member is appointed by the TBARTA West Central Florida Metropolitan Planning Organization Chairs Coordinating Committee (TBARTA MPOs CCC) who must be a chair of one of the five Metropolitan Planning Organizations in the region (Citrus County is a TPO);
Two members are the Mayor or the Mayor’s designee of the respective largest municipality within the areas served by the Pinellas Suncoast Transit Authority (PSTA) and the Hillsborough Area Regional Transit Authority (HART);
One member is the Mayor, or designee, of the largest municipality within Manatee or Sarasota County, providing that the membership rotates every two years;
Also on the Board are four business-community representatives appointed by the Governor, each of whom must reside in one of the seven counties of TBARTA; and,
The two non-voting advisors shall be the District Secretaries of the Florida Department of Transportation (Department) within the seven-county area of TBARTA (District's 1 and 7).

The members appointed by the respective Commissions, TBARTA MPOs CCC, or Mayors serve two-year terms and may serve no more than three consecutive terms. The Governor-appointed members serve three-year terms and may serve only two consecutive terms.

Citizens Advisory Committee
The TBARTA Citizens Advisory Committee (CAC) is made up of residents and business persons from around the region. Members are appointed by the TBARTA Board members and volunteer their time to advise the Board on a range of issues that affect TBARTA and the region.

Transit Management Committee
The TBARTA Transit Management Committee (TMC) is made up of the region’s transit agency directors, who advise the Board on implementation of the Regional Transportation Master Plan.

Public engagement
TBARTA maintains an ongoing public conversation about regional transportation, via social media on Facebook, Twitter, YouTube, and Instagram. During periods of work to update the Regional Master Plan, TBARTA also holds telephone-based town hall meetings, which garner thousands of participants. The public is always invited to TBARTA's regularly-scheduled Board and Committee meetings as well.

References

External links
 Official TBARTA website

Transportation in the Tampa Bay area
Intermodal transportation authorities in Florida
Transportation in Citrus County, Florida
Transportation in Hernando County, Florida
Transportation in Hillsborough County, Florida
Transportation in Manatee County, Florida
Transportation in Pasco County, Florida
Transportation in Pinellas County, Florida
Transportation in Sarasota County, Florida
2007 establishments in Florida